North Bloomfield can refer to:

Places
United States
 North Bloomfield, California
 North Bloomfield, Ohio
 North Bloomfield, Wisconsin
 North Bloomfield Township, Morrow County, Ohio

Other uses
 Bloomfield High School (North Bloomfield, Ohio)
 North Bloomfield Mining and Gravel Company